Michael Morgan (born 30 December 1961) is a Jamaican bobsledder. He competed in the two man event at the 1998 Winter Olympics.

References

External links
 

1961 births
Living people
Jamaican male bobsledders
Olympic bobsledders of Jamaica
Bobsledders at the 1998 Winter Olympics
Place of birth missing (living people)